Black Creek is a tributary of the Stanislaus River in Calaveras County, California, flowing about  in a southerly direction through the Sierra Nevada foothills. Originating near Carmen Peak, it joins the Stanislaus River in Tulloch Lake, near Copperopolis.

See also
List of rivers of California

References

Rivers of Calaveras County, California